Afrodita Salihi (born 11 April 1989) is a Macedonian footballer who plays as a forward for ŽFK Dragon 2014. She is a member of the Macedonia women's national football team.

Club career
Amongst the teams Salihi played for were ŽFK Škiponjat, ŽFK Naše Taksi, Olympia Sofia and ŽFK Edinstvo.

International goals

References

External links
 

1989 births
Living people
Women's association football forwards
Macedonian women's footballers
Footballers from Skopje
Albanian footballers from North Macedonia
North Macedonia women's international footballers
Macedonian expatriate footballers
Macedonian expatriate sportspeople in Bulgaria
Expatriate footballers in Bulgaria
ŽFK Dragon 2014 players